The Afghanistan Research and Evaluation Unit (AREU) is an independent research organization based in Kabul, Afghanistan. It aims to provide a firm basis for policy and practice in the country's rapidly changing environment by conducting in-depth, on-the-ground research. Funding is provided by a variety of governments and agencies.

History
In 2000 the Strategic Monitoring Unit (SMU) was established in Islamabad by the Afghan Support Group, to improve emergency response by ensuring that lessons learned from similar situations around the world were analysed and disseminated (at that time Afghanistan was largely under Taliban rule). The SMU produced two papers: a report on the northern province of Badakhshan., and a review of the Strategic Framework for Afghanistan 
After the toppling of the Taliban government in late 2001, the SMU was renamed the Afghanistan Research and Evaluation Unit (AREU) and given a new mandate.  In early 2002 it moved to Kabul.

About Our Work
AREU's research addresses the complete spectrum of actors in Afghanistan, from remote communities to officials at the highest levels of government.

Involving rigorous, qualitative fieldwork across a range of provinces, it provides a unique insight into many of the social, economic and political dynamics at work in the country today. Projects range from multi-year investigations of national development issues to short-term responses to priority topics as they arise.

Sample of Recent Projects
AREU's research focuses on areas and issues of importance to policy makers. Current research themes are: governance, gender, livelihoods and human security, natural resource management, political economy and markets.

Natural Resource Management (2010–12): An integrated project on rural water management and opium poppy cultivation in the provinces of Helmand, Nangahrar, Balkh and Badakhshan.
The research aims to investigate how the River Basin Management (RBM) model is progressing in the EU-supported Panj-Amu River Basin Management Programme (P-ARBP) and the prospects of its replication in other river basins in Afghanistan. It also seek to facilitate the achievement of rural livelihood security and stability in Afghanistan by exploring the dynamics of the opium economy in the 2010-11 growing season and beyond.

Women's Participation in Development (2012): The research examines the various assumptions that justify the “gender-inclusive” development initiatives of some of the national development programmes and the micro-finance institutions.
It particularly  examines the assumption that women's participation in community organisation or development projects at the community level serves to “empower” them as individuals and as a group. It also explores what motivates and enables women to participate in these different programmes and what limits their participation. Finally, it provides an analysis of the different models and methods being used by facilitating partners involved in different national development programmes, and how these impact women's ability to participate and the effects of such participation.

Communicating our Research
AREU actively disseminates its research, which is always made publicly available and free of charge.

Publications:  All AREU publications are available online and in hardcopy, with many translated into Dari and Pashto.  These range from in-depth provincial case studies to peer-reviewed policy briefs and professionally published reports.

Updated each year, the A to Z Guide to Afghanistan Assistance aims to enhance general understanding of the array of actors, structures and government processes related to aid and reconstruction efforts in the country. The guide provides: a wide-ranging glossary of assistance terms, an overview of Afghanistan's system of government, a series of country and city maps, key primary documents, and an extensive contacts directory that includes government agencies, NGOs, donors, and international actors. The latest version will be published early 2013 and will contain a dedicated section to the transition period.

When the first edition of the A to Z Guide was published in 2002, the goal then—as it is now—was “to provide a guide to the terms, structures, mechanisms and coordinating bodies critical to the Afghanistan relief and reconstruction effort to help ensure a shared vocabulary and common understanding.” Over the years the guide increased in scope and size, but has always followed the same successful model.

Events and briefings: AREU regularly convenes events such as public seminars, roundtable discussions and press conferences. Meanwhile, staff frequently provide private briefings to Afghan and international policymakers.

Library
An important complement to the research and publications of AREU is the library. Since the formation of the unit, statistical publications, NGO reports, policy papers and similar materials have been accumulated and indexed in the AREU Library on-line bibliographic database (built using Greenstone open source software). The library is open to the public and collaborates with other libraries in Kabul to collect and make available publicly documents of research value on Afghanistan.

Notes

External links
 AREU website

Non-profit organisations based in Afghanistan
Research institutes in Afghanistan